Federico Chiesa  (born 25 October 1997) is an Italian professional footballer who plays as a winger for  club Juventus and the Italy national team. He is the son of former footballer Enrico Chiesa.

Coming through Fiorentina's youth academy, Chiesa made his first-team debut in 2016. He stayed at the club for four years, scoring 34 goals in 153 appearances in all competitions. Chiesa moved to Juventus in the 2020–21 season, winning the Coppa Italia and Supercoppa Italiana in his first season.

At international level, Chiesa made his senior debut for Italy in March 2018. He helped his country win the UEFA Euro 2020, while being named in the Team of the Tournament.

Club career

Youth career
Chiesa began his youth career with Settignanese from Settignano, a frazione northeast of Florence, where he was coached by Fiorentina legend Kurt Hamrin.

Fiorentina

2007–2016: Early career
He joined Fiorentina in 2007. Initially a member of their Giovanili side, Chiesa was assigned to the under-19 squad for the 2014–15 season, and scored a single goal in seven appearances for their Primavera side. The following season, he made 23 appearances and scored seven goals. Chiesa signed his first professional contract with Fiorentina in February 2016.

2016–17: Breakthrough and established starter
He made his competitive debut for Fiorentina in a 2–1 away defeat against Juventus, during the opening fixture of the 2016–17 Serie A season. Fiorentina manager Paulo Sousa opted to replace him at half-time with loan signing Cristian Tello. On 29 September, Chiesa made his Europa League debut in Fiorentina's 5–1 home win over Qarabağ. On 8 December, he marked his fourth Europa League appearance by scoring his first ever senior goal in a 1–2 away victory over Qarabağ; he was later sent off during the same match for a double booking.

On 15 January 2017, Chiesa appeared to score the match-winner in a 2–1 home win over rivals Juventus, from a Milan Badelj pass; however, the goal was assigned to Badelj, as, following review, the replays did not confirm whether Chiesa had deflected the pass. Later that month, Chiesa extended his contract with Fiorentina until 30 June 2021. On 21 January, he scored his first goal in Serie A in a 3–0 away victory over Chievo. Just eight days later, Chiesa scored his second league goal in a 3–3 home draw against Genoa. On 7 May, he netted the opening goal for Fiorentina in an eventual 2–2 draw against Sassuolo; this being his third goal for the club, and his first in Serie A in nearly four months. The goal came just four minutes after teammate Nikola Kalinić's penalty miss just after the half-hour mark.

2017–2019: Final seasons in Florence
On 16 September 2017, in the 2017–18 season, Chiesa marked his 30th league appearance for Fiorentina with a goal in the Derby dell'Appennino against Bologna; scoring the opener in the 51st minute of the game, in an eventual 2–1 home win. On 30 January 2019, during the 2018–19 season, Chiesa scored a hat-trick in the 7–1 home victory over Roma in the quarter-final match of the Coppa Italia.

Juventus

2020–21: Debut season
On 5 October 2020, Chiesa signed a two-year loan deal with Juventus; a €3 million loan for the first season and a €7 million loan for the second season, with a conditional obligation to buy for €40 million plus €10 million in variables. On 17 October, Chiesa made his debut for Juventus, providing an assist for Álvaro Morata and getting a straight red card in a 1–1 away draw to Crotone. He made his UEFA Champions League debut three days later, in a 2–0 away win over Dynamo Kyiv. He scored his first goal in the competition, and for Juventus, on 2 December, in a 3–0 home win against the same opponent.

Chiesa's first league goal for Juventus came on 16 December, scoring a long-distance goal in a 1–1 home draw against Atalanta. On 6 January 2021, Chiesa scored a brace against league-leaders Milan to help Juventus win 3–1 away from home; it was Milan's first league defeat in 27 games. Chiesa scored three goals against Porto in the 2020–21 UEFA Champions League round of 16: one in the first leg and two in the second leg. However, Juventus were eliminated on the away goals rule. On 19 May, he scored the match–winning goal in a 2–1 victory over Atalanta in the 2021 Coppa Italia Final.

2021–22: Season-ending injury
At the start of the new season, on 29 September 2021, in the 2021–22 UEFA Champions League, Chiesa scored the winning goal in a 1–0 home win against title holders Chelsea in a group stage match, equalling Alessandro Del Piero's record of four consecutive goals in the competition. On 9 January 2022, during a match against Roma, Chiesa suffered an anterior cruciate ligament injury, ruling him out for seven months. Chiesa ended his season early with four goals in 18 appearances.

2022–23
On 2 November 2022, after nearly ten months out of action, Chiesa made his debut of the season in a 2–1 home defeat against Paris Saint-Germain, replacing Fabio Miretti in the 74th minute, in their final 2022–23 UEFA Champions League match.

International career

Youth 
Chiesa was first called-up to the Italy U19 squad in 2015. He was selected as part of Paolo Vanoli's preliminary 27-man squad for the 2016 UEFA Euro Under-19 Championship in Germany. Chiesa played for Italy U19 in friendlies against the Czech Republic, Spain and France. In 2016, he was called-up by Alberigo Evani to the U20s to represent the side at the 2015–16 Under-20 Four Nations Tournament.

In March 2017, Chiesa was called up by Luigi Di Biagio to the U21s for friendlies against Poland and Spain. He made his U21 debut on 23 March 2017, in a 2–1 win against Poland; Chiesa provided the assist to Lorenzo Pellegrini's opener. He retained his place in the starting line-up against Spain in a 2–1 defeat at the Stadio Olimpico.

In June 2017, he was included in the U21 squad for the 2017 UEFA European Under-21 Championship by manager Di Biagio. In Italy's opening match of the tournament on 19 June, he set-up Andrea Petagna's goal with a cross following a corner in a 2–0 win over Denmark. Italy were eliminated by Spain in the semi-finals on 27 June, following a 3–1 defeat.

He took part with the U21 team in the 2019 UEFA European Under-21 Championship held in Italy, where he scored three goals in the group stage phase.

Senior

Early senior career
Despite only being called up to the under-21 side in March 2017, Chiesa was selected by Italy's senior head coach Gian Piero Ventura for the team's unofficial friendly against San Marino in Empoli on 31 May. Chiesa made his unofficial senior international debut in the match, starting in Italy's eventual 8–0 win.

In March 2018, he was awarded his first official senior call-up to the Italy national team, under interim manager Di Biagio, for Italy's friendlies against Argentina and England later that month. On 23 March, he made his official senior international debut in the friendly against Argentina; Italy were defeated 2–0.

His first senior international goal came on 18 November, in a 9–1 home win over Armenia, in Italy's final Euro 2020 qualifier, under manager Roberto Mancini; he also assisted two goals during the match: Ciro Immobile's first goal, and Riccardo Orsolini's goal.

Euro 2020
In June 2021, Chiesa was included in Italy's squad for UEFA Euro 2020. He was named Man of the Match by UEFA in Italy's final group match, a 1–0 victory over Wales in Rome on 20 June, which saw them top their group. On 26 June, he scored the opening goal in a 2–1 extra-time win over Austria in the round of 16 of the tournament at Wembley Stadium. His father Enrico had scored 25 years and 12 days earlier in Italy's second group match at UEFA Euro 1996 in England, a 2–1 loss against eventual runners-up Czech Republic; as such they became the first father and son pair to have scored a goal at the Euros. In the semi-final against Spain on 6 July, he scored the opening goal in a 1–1 draw; a game in which Italy advanced to the final of the tournament after extra time following a 4–2 penalty shoot-out victory. For his performance, Chiesa was named Man of the Match by UEFA for the second time. On 11 July, Chiesa suffered an injury late in the second half of regulation time in the UEFA Euro 2020 Final against England at Wembley Stadium, and was subsequently replaced by Federico Bernardeschi in the 86th minute; Italy went on to win the European Championship following a 3–2 victory in a penalty shoot-out after a 1–1 draw in extra-time. For his performances throughout the competition, he was named in the "Team of the Tournament".

2021 UEFA Nations League Finals
On 6 October, Chiesa assisted Lorenzo Pellegrini's goal in a 2–1 home defeat to Spain in the semi-finals of the 2020–21 UEFA Nations League. On 10 October, he won a penalty from which Domenico Berardi scored the match–winning goal to give Italy a 2–1 home victory over Belgium in the bronze medal match of the 2021 UEFA Nations League Finals.

Style of play
Regarded as a promising young prospect, Chiesa is a talented, fast, skillful, and hardworking player, with good technique, a short stature, and a slender build. Possessing good stamina, acceleration, and dribbling skills, he usually plays as a right winger, a position which enables him to create goalscoring opportunities for teammates, especially by crossing the ball into the penalty box with his stronger right foot. He is also capable of scoring goals himself, and can play on the left wing, a role which allows him to beat opponents with the ball in one on one situations, and cut into the center to shoot on goal with his stronger foot, in particular from outside of the penalty area, despite also being an accurate striker of the ball with his left foot.

Aside from his favoured roles on either flank, he has also been deployed in several other attacking positions, given his capability of playing anywhere across the front line; he has most frequently been played in a central role as either an attacking midfielder or second striker, but has also been fielded as a main striker on occasion. He has even occasionally been used in deeper midfield roles, including as central midfielder. His pace and movement off the ball allow him to exploit spaces and make attacking runs to beat the defensive line and provide depth to his team.

In addition to his primary duties in attack, he is also known for his energy and work-rate, and often contributes to the defensive phase of the game by pressing opponents and chasing the opposition's wingers down the flank in order to win back possession, and has even occasionally been deployed as a right–sided wing back in a 3–5–2 formation. Moreover, he is highly regarded in the media for his composure, due to his penchant for scoring decisive goals in important matches.

Personal life
Chiesa's father, Enrico, was also a professional footballer; he played for various Serie A clubs, most notably Parma, Fiorentina and Siena, and represented the Italy national team. Chiesa enrolled at the International School of Florence, where he frequently took English lessons. He also spent two years at university, studying Sports Science.

Career statistics

Club

International

Italy score listed first, score column indicates score after each Chiesa goal.

Honours 
Juventus
 Coppa Italia: 2020–21
 Supercoppa Italiana: 2020

Italy
 UEFA European Championship: 2020
 UEFA Nations League third place: 2020–21

Individual
 UEFA European Championship Team of the Tournament: 2020
 Pallone Azzurro: 2021
 Serie A Team of the Year: 2020–21

Orders
 Knight of the Order of Merit of the Italian Republic: 2021

Notes

References

External links

Profile at the Juventus F.C. website
 Lega Serie A Profile  
 FIGC Profile 

1997 births
Living people
Footballers from Genoa
Italian footballers
Italy youth international footballers
Italy under-21 international footballers
Italy international footballers
Association football midfielders
Association football wingers
Association football forwards
ACF Fiorentina players
Juventus F.C. players
Serie A players
UEFA Euro 2020 players
UEFA European Championship-winning players
Knights of the Order of Merit of the Italian Republic